Lee Willard Graham (born September 22, 1959) is a former outfielder in Major League Baseball who played briefly for the Boston Red Sox during the  season. Listed at 5' 10", 170 lb., Graham batted and threw left-handed.

Graham went hitless in six at-bats, while scoring two runs with one RBI in five games. He appeared in three games as an outfielder, collecting a perfect 1.000 fielding average in seven chances.

Baseball career
Lee was selected by the Boston Red Sox in the 26th round (641st overall) of the 1977 June Amateur Baseball draft out of Forest High School (Florida).

External links

1959 births
Living people
Baseball players from Florida
Major League Baseball outfielders
Boston Red Sox players
Richmond Braves players
African-American baseball players
Bristol Red Sox players
Elmira Pioneers players
Pawtucket Red Sox players
Winston-Salem Red Sox players
Winter Haven Red Sox players